Claudia Gerini (born 18 December 1971) is an Italian actress and singer.

Life and career
Born in Rome, Gerini won the National Competition of Miss Teenager in 1985. She got her first part in a film, La ballata di Eva, at 14. She subsequently played in Ciao mà, Roba da ricchi and Night Club, by Sergio Corbucci, and many others. At 19 she worked for the popular TV show Non è la Rai, a sort of academy with one hundred girls singing, dancing and gaming.

Gerini's first major role was in Il padre e il figlio, directed by Pasquale Pozzessere. She later moved to Paris to learn French for several months, travelling a lot between Italy and France without leaving off University. At 22 she returned to Italy and got a role as protagonist in Angelo e Beatrice, a theatrical work by Francesco Apolloni (writer and director) presented on the stage at the Theater Coliseum in Rome, where director and actor Carlo Verdone noticed her. The encounter with Verdone produced Viaggi di nozze and I'm Crazy About Iris Blond, both Christmas box-office successes.

Gerini later collaborated with Leonardo Pieraccioni, Massimo Ceccherini, Antonio Rezza and Antonello De Leo, and moved both to Los Angeles, U.S. and Madrid, Spain to improve her English and Spanish, respectively. In Spain she starred in Desafinado by M. G. Pereira  and La playa de Los Galagos by M. Camus. Other roles include Francesca e Nunziata, directed by Lina Wertmüller, Al cuore si comanda, Non ti muovere, La sconosciuta and the recent Nero bifamiliare, directed by her then-partner, singer-songwriter Federico Zampaglione (Tiromancino).

Personal life 
Claudia is the mother of two daughters, Rosa and Linda.

Filmography

Films

Television

Stage

Video games

Awards and nominations
 2014: Nominated to David di Donatello for Best Supporting Actress for her performance in Tutta colpa di Freud

References

External links
 

1971 births
Actresses from Rome
Italian television personalities
Living people